Valo Urho (30 January 1916 – 5 December 2001) was a Finnish sailor. He competed in the 6 Metre event at the 1948 Summer Olympics.

References

External links
 

1916 births
2001 deaths
Finnish male sailors (sport)
Olympic sailors of Finland
Sailors at the 1948 Summer Olympics – 6 Metre
Sportspeople from Helsinki